Zhou Danhong (born 17 October 1967) is a Chinese sport shooter who competed in the 1988 Summer Olympics and in the 1992 Summer Olympics.

References

1967 births
Living people
Chinese female sport shooters
ISSF rifle shooters
Olympic shooters of China
Shooters at the 1988 Summer Olympics
Shooters at the 1992 Summer Olympics
Shooters at the 1986 Asian Games
Shooters at the 1990 Asian Games
Shooters at the 1994 Asian Games
Asian Games medalists in shooting
Asian Games gold medalists for China
Medalists at the 1986 Asian Games
Medalists at the 1990 Asian Games
Medalists at the 1994 Asian Games